Acetivibrio  aldrichii  is a Gram-positive, anaerobic, mesophilic, spore-forming and motile bacterium from the genus Acetivibrio.

References

 

Bacteria described in 1990
Oscillospiraceae